is the 4th album of J-pop singer Kotoko under Geneon Entertainment. It was released on October 14, 2009. This album debuted in the sixth place of the Oricon daily charts, making this album one of the most successful in KOTOKO's musical career.

This album covers her "Hayate no Gotoku!", "Shichiten Hakki Shijou Shugi!", "Real Onigokko", and "Blaze" singles. There are 9 new songs including a cover song performed with I've Sound creator, Kazuya Takase.

The album comes in a limited CD+DVD edition (GNCV-1014) and a regular CD-only edition (GNCV-1015). The DVD will contain the PV and making for ε: Epsilon. And the album contained a special CD which contains a 2009 remix and the original version of her song .

Track listing 

2009 albums
Kotoko (singer) albums